Clifford Charles Arquette (December 27, 1905 ⁠– September 23, 1974) was an American actor and comedian. Famous for his persona Charley Weaver, played on numerous television shows.

Early life and career

Cliff Arquette was born on December 27 1905, in Toledo, Ohio, the youngest of four children born to Winifred Ethel Clark (July 30, 1878 ⁠– February 12, 1966) and Charles Augustus Arquette (October 23, 1878 ⁠– August 12, 1927), a vaudevillian. His siblings were Naomi "Jane" Arquette Hammett (1899⁠–1934), Russell Arquette (1901⁠–1982), and Lester Kear Arquette (1904⁠–1969). Cliff was of part French-Canadian descent, and his family's surname was originally "Arcouet". The eventual patriarch of the Arquette show business family, Arquette was the father of actor Lewis Arquette with his wife Mildred LeMay (Speight) and the grandfather of actors Rosanna, Richmond, Patricia, Alexis, and David Arquette. In his early career, Arquette was a nightclub pianist, later joining the Henry Halstead orchestra in 1923.. Cliff Arquette fathered another son named Alden Arquette in 1921 when he and his girlfriend were 16. Their marriage was annulled (there is no record of the marriage) but there is a record of Alden's birth.

Arquette is credited for inventing the modern rubber theatrical prosthetic mask, which was flexible enough to allow changing facial expressions, and porous enough to allow air to reach the actor's skin.

Arquette had been a performer in radio, theatre, and motion pictures until 1956, when he retired from show business. At one time, he was credited with performing in 13 different daily radio shows at different stations in the Chicago market, getting from one studio to the other by way of motorboats along the Chicago River through its downtown. One such radio series he performed on was The Adventures of Wild Bill Hickok.

Arquette and Dave Willock had their own radio show, Dave and Charley, in the early 1950s, as well as a television show by the same name that was on the air for three months. It was when Arquette performed on the shows that he created and inaugurated his performances as his eventual trademark character of Charley Weaver.

Charley Weaver

Arquette accepted Jack Paar's invitation to appear on Paar's NBC Tonight Show in 1957. Arquette had previously created the character of "Charley Weaver, the wild old man from Mount Idy". He would read a letter from his "Mamma" back home. This characterization proved so popular that Arquette almost never again appeared in public as himself, but nearly always as Charley Weaver, complete with his squashed hat, little round glasses, rumpled shirt, broad tie, baggy pants, and suspenders. Arquette could often convulse Paar and the audience into helpless laughter by way of his timing and use of double entendres in describing the misadventures of his fictional family and townspeople. As Paar noted, in his foreword to Arquette's first Charley Weaver book:

Sometimes his jokes are old, and I live in the constant fear that the audience will beat him to the punch line, but they never have. And I suspect that if they ever do, he will rewrite the ending on the spot. I would not like to say that all his jokes are old, although some have been found carved in stone. What I want to say is that in a free-for-all ad lib session, Charley Weaver has and will beat the fastest gun alive.

Arquette, as Charley Weaver, hosted Charley Weaver's Hobby Lobby on ABC from September 30, 1959, to March 23, 1960. He also appeared as Charley Weaver on The Roy Rogers and Dale Evans Show (September 29 to December 29, 1962).

In 1960, Arquette was honored with a star on the Hollywood Walk of Fame for his contribution to radio.

Later career and legacy

One exception to his portrayal of Charley Weaver was his characterization of Mrs. Butterworth. A Civil War buff, in the 1950s he opened the Charley Weaver Museum of the Civil War in Gettysburg, Pennsylvania. The museum was housed in a building that had served as headquarters for General O.O. Howard during the Battle of Gettysburg, and remained in operation for about ten years. The site later became the Soldier's National Museum, and closed in early November 2014.

Arquette spent some time in the hospital in the early 1970s, due to heart disease. He suffered a stroke in 1972 that kept him off Hollywood Squares for some time. Among those who occupied his square during his absence was George Gobel, whose appearances on the show became more frequent after Arquette's death, later replacing Arquette in the lower left square. Partially paralyzed by the stroke and using a wheelchair, Arquette eventually returned to Squares.

Death
Arquette died in Burbank, California, following a stroke on September 23, 1974. He was 68 years old.

Selected bibliography
 Charley Weaver's Letters from Mamma (with introduction by Jack Paar;  John C. Winston Co., 1959)
 Charley Weaver's Family Album (These Are My People) (John C. Winston Co., 1960)
 Things Are Fine in Mount Idy (Holt, Rinehart and Winston, 1960)

Discography
 Charley Weaver Sings for His People (Music direction by Charles (Puddin' Head) Dant and the Mt. Idy Symphonette, Columbia HF LP, Artist: Charley Weaver, Release date: 1959)
 Let's Play Trains with Cliff Arquette (Edited by H.W. Dunn, Produced by H. Krasne, Sound Effects by Ralph Curtiss and Byron Winett, Columbia HL 9513 (Harmony) LP, Release Date: 1960)

References

External links

 
 

1905 births
1974 deaths
Male actors from Chicago
Male actors from Toledo, Ohio
American male comedians
American male film actors
American male television actors
American people of French-Canadian descent
Cliff Arquette
20th-century American male actors
Comedians from Illinois
20th-century American comedians